Jack Gillen (born 2001) is an Irish hurler who plays for Westmeath Championship club Cullion and at inter-county level with the Westmeath senior hurling team. He usually lines out as a forward.

Career

Gillen first played hurling at juvenile and underage levels with the Cullion club just outside Mullingar. He eventually progressed onto the club's top adult team and won a Westmeath SBHC title in 2021. Gillen first appeared on the inter-county scene as a member of the Westmeath minor hurling team in 2017 before later lining out with the under-21 team. He was drafted onto the Westmeath senior hurling team in 2021.

Honours

Cullion
Westmeath Senior B Hurling Championship: 2021

Westmeath
Joe McDonagh Cup: 2021

References

2001 births
Living people
Cullion hurlers
Westmeath inter-county hurlers